Diaminomaleonitrile (DAMN) is an organic compound composed of two amino groups and two nitrile groups bonded to a central alkene unit. The systematic name reflects its relationship to maleic acid.

The chemical can be formed by polymerization of hydrogen cyanide and can be used as the starting point for the synthesis of several classes of heterocyclic compounds. Therefore, it has been considered as a possible organic chemical present in prebiotic conditions.

History 
Diaminomaleonitrile was first isolated in 1873 as a black solid, when it was recognized as a polymer of hydrogen cyanide with the formula (HCN)x. It was identified as the tetramer (HCN)4 by ebullioscopy in 1923. The cis-configuration of the amino groups was shown in 1928 through reaction with glyoxal to give 2,3-diaminopyrazine, and the full structure was shown in 1955 to be diaminomaleonitrile, as opposed to the isomeric aminoiminosuccinonitrile (AISN).

Role in abiogenesis 
Diaminomaleonitrile has been proposed since the 1960s as a key substance for the prebiotic synthesis of nucleobases. Photochemical rearrangement of DAMN under UV light gives 4-aminoimidazole-5-carbonitrile (AICN), which can react further to form various nucleobases.

Early experiments have also suggested that certain amino acids, such as aspartic acid, alanine, and glycine, may have their probiotic origins in the acidic hydrolysis of diaminomaleonitrile.

Due to the ubiquity of hydrogen cyanide and its oligomers in space, it has been proposed that the dark material found in comets may consist of diaminomaleonitrile and higher oligomers, and that such polymers of HCN may have covered the surface of the early Earth.

References

Nitriles
Diamines
Enamines